Nymphicula yoshiyasui is a moth in the family Crambidae. It was described by David John Lawrence Agassiz in 2002. It is found from Taiwan and Okinawa to Amami-Oshima in Japan.

The length of the forewings is 6.7 mm for males and 7.1 mm for females. The ground colour of the forewings is pale orange, but fuscous from the base to the antemedial band, but scattered with pale orange scales on posterior portion. The hindwings are pale orange from the base to the antemedial band. The area between the antemedial band and medial area is pale orange, but its anterior portion is whitish, mixed with dark brown scales. The species is similar to Nymphicula junctalis. The diagnostic features are the five marginal eyespots on the hindwings, the pale orange apex of the forewings.

Full-grown larvae reach a length of 8-10.1 mm.

Etymology
The species is named in honour of Dr. Yutaka Yoshiyasu who discovered the species.

References

Nymphicula
Moths described in 2002